David Joseph Walker (born 1976) is a male retired boxer who competed for England.

Boxing career
Walker was the National Champion in 1998 after winning the prestigious ABA welterweight title, boxing out of the Fisher ABC.

He represented England in the welterweight (-67Kg) division, at the 1998 Commonwealth Games in Kuala Lumpur, Malaysia.

He turned professional on 20 April 2000 and was known as Kid Dynamite.

References

1976 births
English male boxers
Boxers at the 1998 Commonwealth Games
Living people
Welterweight boxers
Commonwealth Games competitors for England